The Alexandria Blizzard is a  USA Hockey-sanctioned Tier III Junior ice hockey team playing in the North American 3 Hockey League (NA3HL). The team plays their home games at Runestone Community Center in Alexandria, Minnesota. The franchise is owned by Chris and Mitri Canavati, the owners of the Tier II North American Hockey League's Brookings Blizzard.

History
Established in 2012, the Blizzard replaced the North American Hockey League team that had recently relocated to Brookings, South Dakota. The owners of the NAHL franchise, Chris and Mitri Canavati, relocated their team due to Alexandria being the smallest market in the Tier II league. However, they still wanted to keep Alexandria as a junior hockey market and founded the Tier III level expansion team as a replacement. The Blizzard announced their first head coach was Jeff Crouse, formerly the assistant coach for the NAHL Blizzard.

Season-by-season records

References

External links
 Blizzard website
 NA3HL website

Ice hockey in Minnesota
Ice hockey teams in Minnesota
2012 establishments in Minnesota
Ice hockey clubs established in 2012
Douglas County, Minnesota